Animales sueltos is an Argentine talk show TV program. It is hosted by Alejandro Fantino and aired by América TV since 2009.

Awards
 2013 Tato Awards for best panelist (Coco Sily)
 2013 Martín Fierro Awards: Best male TV host
 2015 Martín Fierro Awards
 Best general interest program

References

Argentine television talk shows
América TV original programming
2009 Argentine television series debuts